Halina Kanasz (born 30 January 1953 in Henrykowo) is a Polish luger who competed during the 1970s. She won two medals in the women's singles event at the FIL European Luge Championships with a silver in 1974 and a bronze in 1975.

Kanasz also competed in the women's singles event at the 1972 Winter Olympics in Sapporo, finishing tied for sixth with a fellow Pole, Wiesława Martyka, and at the 1976 Winter Olympics in Innsbruck finished at 14th.

References
 List of European luge champions 
 Wallenchinsky, David. (1984). "Luge: Women's Singles". In The Complete Book the Olympics: 1896-1980. New York: Penguin Books. p. 577.

Lugers at the 1972 Winter Olympics
Lugers at the 1976 Winter Olympics
Living people
Polish female lugers
1953 births
Olympic lugers of Poland
People from Lidzbark County
Sportspeople from Warmian-Masurian Voivodeship